KKXX may refer to:

 KKXX-FM, a radio station (93.1 FM) licensed to Shafter, California, United States
 KKXX (AM), a radio station (930 AM) licensed to Paradise, California, United States
 KKXX (amino acid sequence), a sequence in the amino acid structure of a protein which keeps it from secreting from the ER